Victor Saul Navasky (July 5, 1932 – January 23, 2023) was an American journalist, editor, and academic. He was publisher emeritus of The Nation and George T. Delacorte Professor Emeritus of Professional Practice in Magazine Journalism at Columbia University. He was editor of The Nation from 1978 until 1995 and its publisher and editorial director from 1995 to 2005. Navasky's book Naming Names (1980) is considered a definitive take on the Hollywood blacklist. For it he won a 1982 National Book Award for Nonfiction.

He was awarded the I.F. Stone Medal for Journalistic Independence by Harvard's Nieman Foundation in 2017.

Early life and education 
Navasky was born on the Upper West Side of Manhattan, the son of Esther (Goldberg) and Macy Navasky. In 1946, when he was in the eighth grade, he helped to raise money for the Irgun Zvai Leumi — by passing a contribution basket at performances of Ben Hecht’s play, A Flag is Born.

He was a graduate of Swarthmore College (1954), where he was elected to Phi Beta Kappa and received high honors in the social sciences. While serving in the United States Army from 1954 to 1956, he was stationed at Fort Richardson in Alaska. Following his discharge, he enrolled in Yale Law School on the G.I. Bill and received his LL.B. in 1959. While at Yale Law, he co-founded and edited the political satire magazine, Monocle.

Career 
Before joining The Nation, Navasky was an editor at The New York Times Magazine. He also wrote a monthly column about the publishing business ("In Cold Print") for the Times Book Review.

Navasky was named the editor of The Nation in 1978. In that forum, for many years, he was immortalized in Calvin Trillin's Uncivil Liberties column as "the wily and parsimonious Victor S. Navasky", or "The W. & P." for short.

Navasky was a supporter of alleged Soviet spy Alger Hiss, having published vociferous defences of the man's innocence in The Nation both during his lifetime and after.

In 1994, while on a year's leave of absence from The Nation, he served first as a fellow at the Institute of Politics at Harvard Kennedy School and then as a senior fellow at the Freedom Forum Media Studies Center at Columbia University. When he returned to The Nation, he led a group of investors in buying the magazine, and became its publisher.

Navasky also served as a Guggenheim fellow, a visiting scholar at the Russell Sage Foundation, and Ferris Visiting Professor of Journalism at Princeton University. He taught at a number of colleges and universities and contributed articles and reviews to numerous magazines and journals of opinion.

In addition to his Nation responsibilities, Navasky was also director of the George T. Delacorte Center for Magazine Journalism at Columbia University, a member of the board of Independent Diplomat, and a regular commentator on the public radio program Marketplace.

In 2005, Navasky was named chairman of the Columbia Journalism Review (CJR). This appointment engendered some controversy; as Navasky's name did not appear on the masthead, critics on the political right saw this as hiding that, despite the magazine's purported lack of political bias, a "major left-wing polemicist is calling the shots at CJR without any mention on the masthead."

In 2005, Navasky received the George Polk Book Award given annually by Long Island University to honor contributions to journalistic integrity and investigative reporting.  He served on the boards of the Authors Guild, International PEN, and the Committee to Protect Journalists.

In 2020, Navasky was appointed to the board of Defending Rights & Dissent.

Personal life and death 
Navasky married Anne Strongin in 1966. They had three children. Navasky died from pneumonia at a hospital in Manhattan on January 23, 2023, at the age of 90.

Publications 
 Kennedy Justice (Atheneum, 1971)
 Naming Names (Viking, 1980); a book concerning the Hollywood blacklist
 The Experts Speak: The Definitive Compendium of Authoritative Misinformation (with Christopher Cerf), 1984, 1998
 A Matter of Opinion (Farrar Straus and Giroux, 2005)
 Mission Accomplished! (or How We Won the War in Iraq), (with Christopher Cerf), 2008 
 The Art of Controversy: Political Cartoons and Their Enduring Power, (Knopf 2013)

Magazines 
Navasky was a publisher of magazines.
 Monocle (founding editor)
 The Nation (editor, later publisher)
 Columbia Journalism Review (chairman)

Notes

References

External links 
 
 Columbia Journalism School profile page
 
 
 Videos of 2010 Delacorte Magazine Lectures, moderated by Victor Navasky
 1984 audio interview of Victor Navasky, RealAudio at Wired for Books.org with Don Swaim
 The Bat Segundo Show #64 (2006 podcast interview with Navasky)
 2008 Interview with Victor Navasky and Christopher Cerf about their book, Mission Accomplished! (or How We Won the War in Iraq), on Bill Moyers' Journal
 Interview with Victor Navasky on Barack Obama and his politics for change by Paul Jay
 
 
Victor S. Navasky Papers, Tamiment Library and Robert F. Wagner Labor Archives ar New York University.

1932 births
2023 deaths
20th-century American journalists
21st-century American journalists
American male journalists
American people of Ukrainian-Jewish descent
Columbia University Graduate School of Journalism faculty
Columbia University faculty
Deaths from pneumonia in New York City
George Polk Award recipients
Harvard Fellows
Fellows of the American Academy of Arts and Sciences
Jewish American writers
Military personnel from New York City
National Book Award winners
People from the Upper West Side
Princeton University alumni
Swarthmore College alumni
The Nation editors
The New York Times editors
Waldorf school alumni
Writers from Manhattan
Yale Law School alumni